Hans Wloka (8 March 1925 – 8 April 1976) was a German footballer.

He played for Eintracht Frankfurt from 1947 to 1957.

Honours 
 Oberliga Süd: 1952–53; runners-up 1953–54

References

External links 
 Hans Wloka at eintracht-archiv.de

1925 births
1976 deaths
German footballers
People from Silesian Voivodeship
Eintracht Frankfurt players
Association football defenders
Association football midfielders